Salchak Kalbakkhorekovich Toka (– 11 May 1973) was a Tuvan and later, Soviet politician. He was General Secretary of the Tuvinian department of the CPSU from 1944 to 1973; previously, he was the General Secretary of the Central Committee of the Tuvan People's Revolutionary Party and was the supreme ruler of the Tuvan People's Republic from 1932 until its annexation by the Soviet Union in 1944.

Biography
Salchak Toka was a member of the Communist University of the Toilers of the East (Kommunisticheskiy universitet trudyashchikhsya Vostoka) in Moscow and Kyzyl. In 1929, the Soviets arrested the head of state Donduk Kuular. Meanwhile, five Tuvan graduates of the Communist University of the Toilers of the East were appointed commissars extraordinary to Tuva. Their loyalty to Stalin ensured that they would pursue policies, such as collectivization, that Donduk had ignored. A coup was launched in 1929. On 6 March 1932, Salchak Toka replaced Donduk as General Secretary of the Tuvan People's Revolutionary Party.

Salchak Toka established close contacts with Joseph Stalin. After the execution of Donduk Kuular in 1932, Salchak Toka became the ruler of Tannu Tuva. He introduced a communist ideology after the Soviet model, the nomad agriculture was collectivised and the traditional religions (Tibetan Buddhism and Shamanism) were suppressed. A personal cult developed around him, and he was awarded numerous Soviet prizes for his literary works.

In 1940 he married Khertek Anchimaa, who was Chairwoman of the Little Khural. In 1944 he requested that Tannu Tuva should be annexed by the Soviet Union. The event took place on 30 October 1944 de jure via Mikhail Kalinin. Tuva was initially an autonomous oblast of the Russian Soviet Federative Socialist Republic (RSFSR) and starting from 10 October 1961 as the Tuvan Autonomous Soviet Socialist Republic (Tuva ASSR). Salchak Toka remained up to his death in 1973 the General Secretary of the Tuvan department of the Communist Party of the Soviet Union.

References 

1901 births
1973 deaths
People from Tuva
Tuvan people
Communist University of the Toilers of the East alumni
History of the Tuvan People's Republic
People from Kyzyl
Husbands of national leaders